Ochthocosmus is a genus of flowering plants belonging to the family Ixonanthaceae.

Its native range is Southern Tropical America, Western Central Tropical Africa.

Species
Species:

Ochthocosmus attenuatus 
Ochthocosmus barrae 
Ochthocosmus berryi 
Ochthocosmus floribundus 
Ochthocosmus gossweileri 
Ochthocosmus longipedicellatus 
Ochthocosmus multiflorus 
Ochthocosmus roraimae

References

Ixonanthaceae
Malpighiales genera